Northport Post Office, the U.S. post office in Northport, New York, is located at 244 Main Street in Northport, New York. It serves the ZIP code 11768, which also includes Asharoken, Eaton's Neck, Vernon Valley, Middleville, and Fort Salonga.

Northport Post Office was designed by Louis A. Simon in conjunction with the United States Treasury Department. Simon also designed the Post Office buildings in Bay Shore, Riverhead, and Westhampton Beach. The building was added to the National Register of Historic Places in 1989, along with two other Simon-built post offices.

References

External links

Suffolk County Listings at a private website copying National Register of Historic Places information

Northport, New York
National Register of Historic Places in Huntington (town), New York
Colonial Revival architecture in New York (state)
National Register of Historic Places in Suffolk County, New York
Northport, New York
Buildings and structures in Suffolk County, New York
Government buildings completed in 1936